Saparua is an Austronesian language spoken in the Moluccas of eastern Indonesia. Dialects are diverse, and Latu might be included as one.

References

Saparua
Central Maluku languages
Languages of the Maluku Islands